Joe Johnson is an American football coach.  He served as the head football coach at North Greenville University in Tigerville, South Carolina from 1999 to 2001 and at the University of Pikeville from 2009 to 2010, compiling a career college football coaching record of 10–42.

Head coaching record

References

Year of birth missing (living people)
Living people
Appalachian State Mountaineers football coaches
Charleston Southern Buccaneers football coaches
Lees–McRae Bobcats football coaches
Lenoir–Rhyne Bears football coaches
North Greenville Crusaders football coaches
Pikeville Bears football coaches
Emory and Henry College alumni
People from Abingdon, Virginia